India's Best Dancer is a dance reality show. It is produced by Frames Production India. Subsequently, the show airs on Sony Entertainment Television and also available through SonyLIV OTT platforms. India's Best Dancer was originally started in Hindi language and has been extended into 2 languages spoken in the Indian sub-continent, including Marathi.

The shooting of Season 1 was halted due to the COVID-19 pandemic in India and shooting started on 13 July 2020 and broadcasts have started from 18 July 2020. The spin off Maharashtra's Best Dancer airs on Sony Marathi. Tiger Pop was the winner of Season 1. Online auditions for season 2 began on 5 May 2021 on SonyLIV. The season 2 aired on 16 October 2021. Ground auditions for IBD Season 3 began on 19 Jan 2023.

Summary
India's Best Dancer will showcase the journey of some of the best talent who, with their solo performances, will compete to win the title. The show promises to be the toughest dance reality show on Indian television and the makers have ensured to make it challenging at every step. India's Best Dancer airs every Sat-Sun at 8:00 PM only on Sony Entertainment Television.

Versions
 Currently airing – 0
 Upcoming for airing – 1
 Recently concluded – 1

Judges and hosts

Note: Nora Fatehi replaced Malaika Arora as a judge for some episodes when Arora was unable to join the shoots during Season 1.

Episodes
 Indicates India's Best Dancer (Hindi Tv) Episodes.
 Indicates Maharashtra's Best Dancer (Marathi Tv) Episodes.

See also
Dance Plus
Dance India Dance
Dance Deewane
Super Dancer
India's Got Talent

References

External links 
 India's Best Dancer on Sony_Liv

Dance competition television shows
India's Best Dancer